The Royal Norwegian Ministry of Agriculture and Food is a Norwegian ministry established on 17 February 1900, and is responsible for agriculture, forestry and food in Norway. It is since January 2019 led by Minister of Agriculture and Food Olaug Bollestad (Christian Democratic). The department reports to the parliament (Stortinget).

Organisation
The ministry is divided into the following sections:
 Political staff
 Communication unit
 Department of Administrative and Economic Affairs
 Department of Forest- and Natural Resource Policy
 Department of Food Policy
 Department of Agricultural Policy
 Department of Research, Innovation and Regional Policy

Political staff
 Minister Sylvi Listhaug (Progress Party)
 State Secretary Hanne Blåfjelldal (Progress Party)

Subsidiaries
Under the ministry there are four administrative agencies and two state-owned companies:
 County Governor, or Fylkesmannen (official site) Regional authority of the Government, with a Governor in each of 18 counties.
 Norwegian Agriculture Authority, or Statens landbruksforvaltning (official site) Authority for the agriculture industry.
 Norwegian Food Safety Authority, or Mattilsynet (official site) Controls all aspects of food safety, including agriculture, import and trade.
 Reindeer Husbandry Administration, or Reindriftforvaltningen (official site) Authority for the reindeer husbandry industry.

State enterprises:
 Statskog (official site) Manages the state owned forests and natural property.

Limited companies:
 Staur Farm, or Staur Gård (official site) A farm.

References

External links
 Official web site

 
Agriculture and Food
Norway
Norway
Ministry of Agriculture and Food
Ministry of Agriculture and Food
Ministries established in 1900
1900 establishments in Norway